Lemonis is a Greek surname. Notable people with this surname include:

 Chris Lemonis (born 1970), American college baseball coach
 Georgios Lemonis (born 1943), Greek athlete
 Kaloudis Lemonis (born 1995), Greek football player
 Marcus Lemonis (born 1973), Lebanese-born American businessman
 Takis Lemonis (born 1960), Greek football player

Greek-language surnames